The  are fictional entities from the anime television series Neon Genesis Evangelion, which was produced by Gainax studio and directed by Hideaki Anno. Angels also appear in the manga adaptation of the same name, which was illustrated by Yoshiyuki Sadamoto.

In the original animated work, almost all of the Angels are antagonists of mankind who repeatedly try to reach the headquarters of the special agency Nerv in the city of Tokyo-3. Most of the Angels originate from an entity called Adam, but the eighteenth specimen, humanity, is descended from Lilith, the second Angel. To counter the Angels' invasion, Nerv builds the Evangelions, mechas that just like the Angels have a force field called an AT Field.

The Angels appear in works from the animated series, in spin-off manga, video games, visual novels, in the yonkoma manga Petit Eva: Evangelion@School, and the film tetralogy Rebuild of Evangelion. Their names, which are revealed in the fourteenth and twenty-third episodes of the series, refer to the namesake angels of the Judeo-Christian tradition, except for Adam and Lilith. The characteristics and functions of each Angel are deliberately similar to those of their namesakes in ancient sacred texts. Their designs have been praised by critics and animation enthusiasts, and influenced subsequent animated series.

Conception

During the making of Neon Genesis Evangelion, the production staff decided to set the work on a battle between gods and humans. In one early draft, which was published about two years before airing, Gainax included enemies named , which they conceived as ancient relics scattered all over the globe and left in hibernation by a species called . These enemies were referred to as simple weapons with almost no biological component. According to Gualtiero Cannarsi, the editor who was in charge of the first Italian-language edition of the series, the Gainax studio members might have been inspired by James P. Hogan's Giants series, Arthur C. Clarke's short story "The Sentinel" and 2001: A Space Odyssey. The Apostolos would have been the servants and apostles of the giant Adam, the divine sentinel of a distant alien race formed long before humanity, drawing on Hogan's evolutionary and science fiction themes.

The original authors intended there to have been twenty-eight enemies, the first of which, Adam, would have been found in the Dead Sea region but destroyed in an explosion fifteen years before the events of the series. The first, an "optical combat weapon of light energy condensed into a solid state", would have had a polygonal body and would have been equipped with a rotating, crystal-shaped organ that would be capable of capturing electromagnetic energy from the environment and hurling it against its enemies. The second enemy would appear in the twelfth episode of the series, ; Turel would also perform a suicide attack using its body. The project was shelved during the production, but the ideas were recycled for the Angels Ramiel and Sahaquiel.

The first episode would have featured a confrontation between the Eva-01, which is piloted by Rei, and an Angel named Raziel, which was later replaced with Sachiel. Raziel, described in the original project as a "metal Angel", would have had more anthropomorphic features than Sachiel, similar to those of a giant. In the twenty-fourth episode, titled , there would be a great lunar battle against twelve Apostolos; humans would realize their helplessness in the face of their enemies' overwhelming superiority and "the promised time" would approach. For their number, the authors took inspiration from the twelve apostles of the Lamb that are mentioned in the book of Revelation, but the idea of multiple clashes on the Moon was abandoned and recycled for the battle against the Mass Production Models in the 1997 theatrical conclusion. Another scenario planned two ancient prehistoric civilizations equipped with advanced technology appeared on Earth before the appearance of humanity. The first of the two, known as the "First Ancestral Race", would create artificial humanoids Evangelion, which would then rebel against their creators causing their extinction. A "Second Ancestral Race" would then create the Spear of Longinus in an attempt to defeat them, scattering the dormant Angels around the globe in case anyone tried to reactivate the humanoids. Moreover, in a draft of the twenty-first episode of the series, Misato would mention the origin of the enemies, saying; "I know the Angels aren't just battle weapons left by the First Ancestral Race".

In the final version of the show, the Angels were renamed and indicated in the characters' dialogue with the word  rather than the term , with which the angels of the Christian tradition are usually indicated. Within the series' narrative, Gainax chose to use the English translation for Angel, "messenger", which is written in Latin characters and is readable in graphemes and written in overlays, as in the case of Nerv's computers. In the Christianity, the Greek term apostolos (απόστολος; "sent", "messenger"), indicates the twelve disciples whom Jesus Christ chooses among his followers in honor of the twelve tribes of Israel. Their names, however, are not those of Christ's apostles, but angels mentioned in religious writings. Michael House, the only American member of Gainax, protested about the juxtaposition of the two terms, but Hideaki Anno decided to keep the dual naming of the enemies.

In one early draft of the series, the Nerv's supercomputer, the Magi System, would assign a name to each Angel. The director gave general guidelines for the design of each Angel. Their shapes became reflections of the feelings of Anno's generation, reflecting the climate of Japan in the 1990s. During the broadcast of the series, the Japanese economy and society were perceived in the country as inherently corrupt and decadent, with no one being able to trace the causes, making the concept of "enemy" ambiguous. The enemy of twentieth-century Japan, according to Anno, was neither political nor defined, as in the case of the religious sect Aum Shinrikyō, which in March 1995 attacked the Tokyo subway with sarin gas. The Angels and the character Gendo Ikari were represented as amorphous beings, since for the director the concept of "enemy" is per sé undefined.

Mahiro Maeda drew Gaghiel and Israfel, while Yoshitō Asari designed Sachiel, Shamshel, and Zeruel. The artists avoided giving them anthropomorphic designs, which would have been more challenging during production. In the first two episodes, in which Sachiel appears, the staff had enough resources to hire animators, but for the fifth and sixth they already changed course.

Characteristics

Angels are organic beings whose atomic structure has both particle and wave nature, and therefore characterized by the wave-particle duality of light. At the beginning of the series, their objectives and motivations are unknown, as is the reason for their collective name. The special agency Nerv, with its scientific knowledge, cannot analyze their mode of action, but they are all attracted by an Angel – called Lilith – that is locked in the deepest section of the Nerv's headquarters. The Angels' genetic makeup has a 99.89% affinity with that of humans. They can change shape from vaguely anthropomorphic to that of a geometric solid, and equally variable sizes. Many are equipped with a red sphere known as the "core" or "sphere of light", which is also their main source of energy and weakness. The "fruit of life", an organ of unknown nature, is responsible for their regenerative abilities. Humanity, the last example of an Angel, has the "fruit of knowledge" instead.

Angels have the universal ability to generate a force field called the AT Field, which is similar to that of Evangelion units, and to regenerate their tissues. Their names and attacks have been prophesied in the Dead Sea Scrolls, ancient documents in the possession of a secret organization called Seele, but few people in Nerv seem to be aware of them. The reason they appear in Tokyo-3 one at a time, never attacking collectively, is unknown. In the first episode, Commander Ikari and Deputy Commander Fuyutsuki, observing Sachiel and its regeneration, claim the Angel has acquired a rationality of its own; according to Gendo, "If it couldn't, it wouldn't be capable as an autonomous weapon". In the opening sequence of the seventeenth episode, after Leliel's appearance, Misato Katsuragi claims "there is nothing to suggest such a systematic organization among the Angels", and a member of a mysterious organization known as the Human Instrumentality Committee claims; "It is obvious that they have worked independently, so far". Dissolving the meeting, Nerv director Gendō Ikari says the Angels "are beginning to attain intelligence". According to a guide on the series contained in a manual for the card game , there is a connection between the Angels; each Angel seems to be an evolutionary outgrowth of the previous one, and the fact they attack one at a time suggests they are aware of the status of each of the other specimens and react accordingly. To verify the nature of an Angel, Nerv analyzes a wave diagram of unidentified objects, which is indicated by the expression "Blood Type: Blue".

In Neon Genesis Evangelion

Adam

 is the progenitor of most of the Angels. In the original animated series, it is represented as a giant of light with features similar to those of an Evangelion. The Katsuragi research team finds Adam in Antarctica and begins to examine its energy source, a perpetual energy system named the S2 engine. Scientists awaken Adam, applying the Super-Solenoid theory, but because of an accident during the experiment a planetary catastrophe known as Second Impact occurs, and Adam is reduced to an embryonic state. In 2015 Ryoji Kaji transports Adam to the Nerv headquarters, handing it over to the commander of the agency, Gendo Ikari, who calls it "the key to the Human Instrumentality Project" and "the first human being". Adam's soul is incorporated in the seventeenth Angel Tabris, and Adam's embryo is implanted into Gendo's body.

According to the Old Testament book of Genesis, God created Adam, the first human being, in His image. On the etymological origin of the name Adam have been formulated several theories, for which it would mean "earth", "red" or "created". God then creates Eve, the first woman, from Adam. In the twenty-first episode of Neon Genesis Evangelion, it is revealed the Evangelions were created from biological material from Adam. In the Jewish Kabbalah, Adam is described as a kind of deity, a being that is capable of giving life and as an entity to which all things are destined to return at the end of time. According to writers Kazuhisa Fujie and Martin Foster, Kaworu Nagisa states those who come from Adam must return to Adam referring to this tradition. In Hermetic terminology, humanity in a state of mental and spiritual perfection is referred to as Adam Kadmon. Critic Marc MacWilliams noted Evangelion Adam is portrayed as a giant being of light "as portrayed again in Kabbalistic texts before his Fall". Carl Gustav Horn noted; "the Kabbalistic view is that all other creatures without exception – even the angels and archangels – are based on Adam (Kadamon) but were left incomplete: only Adam (of Genesis) was a complete image of the Divine". A being named Adam, "the first human being", is introduced in the thirty-seventh episode of the series Nadia: The Secret of Blue Water, which Gainax produced and released before Evangelion.

Lilith
[[File:Michelangelo, Fall and Expulsion from Garden of Eden 03.jpg|thumb|upright=0.9|left|Michelangelo's fresco in the Sistine Chapel. Evangelion'''s Adam, Evangelions and Lilith have been compared to the biblical Adam, Eve and Lilith.]]

 is the second Angel. It is kept in the Terminal Dogma, the deepest section of the Nerv headquarters. Lilith's face is covered with a mask on which are drawn the seven eyes of a symbol called the Seele emblem. Lilith has the appearance of a white, anthropomorphic giant whose hands are nailed to a red cross. Instead of lower limbs, it has small, humanoid legs. Few people know Lilith's true identity; even those who know about its existence are made to believe it is Adam, the first Angel. Lilith is revealed by the Angel Tabris in the twenty-fourth episode of the series; Tabris cannot identify Lilith until seeing it. The soul of the Angel is kept inside Rei Ayanami; when the soul joins the body, Lilith initiates the Third Impact, an event in which the souls of all human beings merge into one being. In the film The End of Evangelion (1997), the Angel's body unites with Rei, takes on the form of a girl, and grows to the size of the Earth, developing a giant AT Field.

In a scene in the twenty-third episode, an image of two white giants without the lower part and attached is visible; according to Gainax, this image shows Lilith and the Eva-01 unit. Lilith, according to the video game Neon Genesis Evangelion 2, arrived by chance on Earth in a celestial object called Black Moon, which  along with a White Moon of Adam was sent  by an alien "First Ancestral Race". The Angels are thus the legitimate successors of Adam and the original inhabitants of Earth. The video game also says; "Some [Angels] were trying to access Lilith and reset all life, some of them had nothing in mind, and some were trying to recover their progenitor Adam".

In ancient Mesopotamia, the name Lilith denoted a nocturnal female specter, which is named in the Old Testament book of Isaiah. According to rabbinic literature, Lilith was Adam's first wife, and demons called Lilim were born from their union. The Angel Lilith's design was elaborated upon by Mitsuo Iso, animator and screenwriter of several episodes of the series. According to character designer Yoshiyuki Sadamoto, the original scenario did not include Lilith, which was introduced following the airing of the series and some staff research on Christianity because "not touching Lilith seemed to hurt Anno's pride". In the Rebuild of Evangelion tetralogy, Lilith is present from the beginning. According to an official pamphlet, the purpose of the Angels is to reach and merge with Lilith, which is the reason for the Angels' attacks on Tokyo-3. In the saga, Lilith's aspect has been modified by animator Okama and Hideaki Anno: in Evangelion 1.0 (2007) Lilith has scars on its chest, the result of scientific experiments; its mask, without the seven eyes of Seele, is similar to that of the Angel Sachiel. Lilith, along with Rei and Eva-01, has been compared to the Jungian archetype of the Great Mother, the feminine authority that represents protection, fertility, darkness and inescapable abyss. An official encyclopedia also noted that in astrology there is a concept named Black Moon, which is also named Lilith.

Sachiel

 is the third Angel and the first to attack Tokyo-3 city in the episode "Angel Attack" fifteen years after the Second Impact. Sachiel stands, walks on two legs, and is equipped with two mobile arms. On the upper part of its trunk, it has a disk that is similar to a face, while on the outer sides of the legs it has two gills which it can use both at sea and on land. Once on land, the armed forces of the United Nations attack Sachiel, which can survive heavy bursts of fire from tanks and rocket launchers, and the UN's most powerful weapon, the N2 mine. The attack damages Sachiel's face and temporarily stop its advance. Sachiel then regenerates and replaces its face with a second mobile disk. 

After the crash, Sachiel learns how fighter aircraft work and can replicate their effectiveness, developing the ability to launch explosive beams. Sachiel is capable of making short-distance leaps while remaining at low altitudes. It has strong hand-to-hand combat abilities and can use a pair of f, which are luminescent pointing weapons that are incorporated into the forearms. In the second episode, Sachiel fights with Eva-01 which, after neutralizing Sachiel's AT Field, breaks its upper limbs. Sachiel becomes liquified and transforms itself into a soft sphere that wraps itself around the humanoid's body and explodes.

The name Sachiel means "covering of God". In religious writings, Sachiel is considered the angel of water. Sachiel is counted in the choir of cherubim, who according to the Old Testament protect the tree of life with spears of fire, a detail that possibly inspired the fictional Angel's protractible spears. The authors initially intended the Angel to fight at sea against Unit 02 in the eighth episode "Asuka Strikes!", but this idea was set aside and used for Gaghiel. Sachiel is based on Ishtar, an android that appears in the manga Wahhaman by Yoshitō Asari; its back is inspired by that of a cat. At the storyboard stage, Sachiel's figure had different connotations and its fight was similar to the Ultraman battles. In the first episode, Sachiel appears among the buildings of a submerged city called Odawara and is attacked by a line of tanks placed on the Manazuru road between Nebukawa and Yugawara. In the film Evangelion: 1.0 You Are (Not) Alone, the first installment of the Rebuild saga, Sachiel is referred to as the fourth Angel instead of the third. The animators superimposed images of a light reflecting on an expanse of water and one of the Milky Way on its luminescent core.

Shamshel

 is the fourth Angel and the second that attacks Tokyo-3. Shamshel has a vaguely insect-like appearance and its form fuses that of a mollusk and that of a cetacean. Although it has limbs, Shamshel slowly flies at low altitude, a few tens of meters above the ground, to avoid detection by Nerv radar equipment. Above Shamshel's head are circular spots that resemble eyes; when attacked it can hit its targets with precision even when they are out of the hypothetical field of view of the spots, excluding their function as optical apparatus. Shamshel uses two weapons that are similar to luminescent whips  that have drilling and cutting capabilities, which can to pierce the abdomen of the Eva-01 in battle.

Shamshel has a particularly developed intelligence that allows it to be precise in its movements and to change disposition according to the situation and the target's behavior. Shamshel is shot down by the Unit 01, which pierces its core with the Prog-Knife, and Nerv scientists examine its lifeless body and lock it inside a research site. Samshel is composed of matter with a wave structure whose wavelength corresponds to that of blue light. Moreover, according to Ritsuko Akagi, the DNA map of the Angel corresponds with 99.89% of that of human DNA.

The Angel Shamshel was inspired by the figure of Shamsiel , whose name means "Sun of God", which in the book of Enoch is one of the fallen Watchers and is also believed to be the angel of the day. The name, according to official sources, is an allusion to its fight with Unit 01, which takes place in daylight and ends just before sunset. Shamshel attacks Tokyo-3 from Manazuru city. Its appearance is similar to that of an Alien Bira, an alien race that appears in Ultraseven, and is inspired by that of a creature called "the three-meter extraterrestrial", whose garage kit was made by a Gainax-associated company called General Products. In the Rebuild of Evangelion, Shamshel is the fifth Angel. Its interior contains luminescent matter, while its body has bone-like, semi-transparent shades and mechanical tentacles. After the battle, like all Rebuild Angels, its body liquefies and a rainbow emerges. Its tentacles remain suspended in the air, retaining their shape due to contact with Eva-01 and its AT Field. During the animation process of Evangelion: 1.0 You Are (Not) Alone, the animators drew Shamshel's two whips entirely by hand. During the fight, Shamshel, which is aware of the consequences, severs the Umbilical Cable of the Eva-01.

Ramiel

 is the fifth Angel. Its body is a regular octahedron, and has a shiny, smooth, blue surface. Ramiel is equipped with an accelerated-particle cannon, which, exploiting the collision of subatomic particles, emits a powerful beam of photons through a gap between the two pyramids of the octahedron. Ramiel's core, unlike those of previous Angels, is located inside the body, overcoming the weakness of its predecessors and revealing the existence of their collective and individual cognitive, mnemonic, and evolutionary abilities. In the fifth episode of the series "Rei I", Ramiel strikes the Eva-01 with its light beam before the mecha's exit to the surface. The event suggests Ramiel can detect the presence and position of enemies underground. To face the threat, in the episode "Rei II" Misato Katsuragi elaborates a strategy called Operation Yashima to destroy Ramiel. During the operation, Ramiel again attacks the Eva-01, which is outside the estimated area of the fire. At the end of the fight, the mecha hits Ramiel with a positron cannon, permanently destroying it.

As a source of inspiration for Ramiel, the authors took the monster , which is introduced in the Return of Ultraman series, whose sound effects were used. Anime News Network's Lynzee Loveridge described Ramiel's design as "Anno's shout out to Future Police Urashiman", while Yasutaka Yoshimura compared it with some abstract shapes in the final scenes of Stanley Kubrick's film 2001: A Space Odyssey. The Angel's name Ramiel means "the angel of thunder", in reference to its particle cannon. In the first Rebuild of Evangelion film, Evangelion: 1.0 You Are (Not) Alone, Ramiel is referred to as the sixth Angel, and it can transform its regular octahedron form into a variety of solids. For the Rebuild design, the staff took inspiration from the microorganism Andromeda from the science fiction film of the same name and an image depicting a four-dimensional body moving in a three-dimensional world that Takashi Watabe drew twenty years earlier.

Gaghiel
, the sixth Angel, appears in "Asuka Strikes!" in the Pacific Ocean and goes to attack the UN fleet, which is transporting Eva-02. Gaghiel resembles an aquatic creature; its body has fin-like appendages and a hydrodynamic shape, allowing it to quickly move through water. The upper body has a small, disc-shaped face located above the mouth that is identical to the two disc-shaped faces of Sachiel. The Angel, while not acting upon a well-defined attack strategy, attacks the naval fleet using the bulk of its body, sinking ships. When approaching its targets, it opens its mouth and squeezes its enemies in its jaws. Gaghiel's core, unlike  those of previous Angels, is located inside the mouth. 

During the fight, Gaghiel jumps onto the aircraft carrier Over the Rainbow and moves to attack the Eva-02, which has crashed into the sea in the Itō area. Its annihilation requires an operation conducted by Unit 02 in collaboration with the UN fleet: the mecha, momentarily imprisoned in the jaws of the being, neutralizes the Angel's AT Field and opens its mouth to allow two armored warships, which were evacuated and sunk with the Kingston valves, to penetrate its jaws and fire on the Angel's core. The operation is successful and Gaghiel is defeated by Asuka Langley Soryu and Shinji Ikari. The behavior of the Angel, which appeared at sea away from Tokyo-3, is attributable to the presence of the first Angel Adam on the ships of the fleet. The name Gaghiel, also called Gagiel, Daghiel or Dagiel, in Judeo-Christian folklore is the angel of the fish. Its Hebrew name can be translated as "roaring beast of God", and has been interpreted by writer Will Raus as a possible allusion to its appearance, which is similar to that of a beast fighting in the water.

Israfel
 is the seventh Angel. Like its predecessors, it approaches Tokyo-3 by sea, and is intercepted by Units 01 and 02 in Suruga Bay. Asuka Langley Soryu, aboard her Eva-02, strikes it with its Sonic Glaive splitting it in half. After the attack, the Angel regenerates into two parts, both of which able to fight individually. Israfel attacks and defeats the two mechas, which return to their base to await a second confrontation. Following their first defeat, the UN armed forces attack Israfel, the two parts of which they nickname Kō and Otsu. Thanks to the use of N² weapons, the UN can temporarily stop its advance. The main characteristic of Israfel is its capacity of fission, similar to that of a single-cell organism, and its reversibility. In addition to the body, the Angel changes its color and can also divide its core, which before the division is positioned at the center of the trunk. These features, along with the brightness of its body, resemble those of mercury. The only way to defeat Israfel, according to Misato, is "a double coordinated attack on its core"; between the two parts of the divided Angel is a bond that allows Kō and Otsu to share their behaviors and vulnerability. After a regeneration process, the Angel merges, regains its original form, and again begins its advance. In the second clash with the units, Israfel imitates the weapons used against it in the first battle, launching rays with high destructive potential against the Eva and using its upper limbs as blades. During the fight, Eva-01 and Eva-02, moving in synchronization, attack the Angel. Israfel splits again, and the two units jump into the sky, launching a synchronized kick that destroys its cores.

The seventh Angel is named after the messenger of music and resurrection, Israfil (Arabic: إسرافيل). In Jewish Kabbalah and Islamic culture, Israfel is the angel in charge of blowing the trumpet on the Day of Judgment, a detail related to the attack of Eva-01 and 02, which is harmonized to a sixty-two-second melody. According to Will Raus, Israfel's role of resurrection could allude to the Angel's ability to split, thanks to which it can regenerate after an apparent defeat. The names by which the Nerv calls the two individual parts of Israfel, Kō and Otsu, are equivalent to the Latin letters A and B, the typical schematic nomenclatures attributed to the first two elements of a series. The terms Kō and Otsu come from the series of Heavenly Stems, ten kanjis corresponding to the days of the decades into which the months of the year were divided in ancient Japan.

Sandalphon

, the eighth Angel, is detected inside the volcanic crater of Mount Asama in a human-embryo-like state and enclosed in a chrysalis. The Nerv decides to attempt to capture it, but the being awakens during the attempt and quickly mutates. In its adult form, its body resembles the Limanda fish in both shape and the arrangement of its fins and eyes, which are positioned in pairs on the left side of the frontal part of its back. It collides with Eva-02, demonstrating high levels of physical endurance. Its core is concealed within its body and is not visible to observers. During the fight, Asuka and other Nerv members using the concept of thermal expansion to develop a plan to defeat it. Eva-02, using a coolant in its equipment, causes Sandalphon to undergo thermal constriction, resulting in damage to its body structure.

The fictional Angel's name alludes to Sandalphon (Hebrew:), which in Judeo-Christian mysticism is the angel of embryos and unborn children. During its metamorphosis into its adult form, the producers included a plaintive background voice using the electronically distorted howls of an infant. The Angel's design took inspiration from prehistoric creatures such as the trilobite and the Anomalocaris, an extinct Cambrian predator that was at the center of scientific debates during first airing of the series. The idea of an enemy-capture attempt was planned for the eleventh episode, but moved to the tenth during the production. According to a guide on the original series contained in the game Neon Genesis Evangelion RPG, the Sandalphon episode suggests dormant, larval Angels are hidden around the world. An official encyclopedia on the series links its appearance with the biblical Book of Enoch, in which the word "Heaven", the abode of angels, actually refers to an Earthly location; because Sandalphon is discovered in the magma chamber of a volcano, Evangelion Angels exist "in the same world as ours".

Matarael
The ninth Angel , also known as Matriel, resembles an arthropod arachnid chelicerate. Unlike arthropods, it has a single central body, from the top of which extends four long, slender limbs that are oversized compared to the rest of the structure, making it akin to the opilionid subclass. The main body is similar to a geometric solid obtained from the section of ellipsoid. Nine human-eye-like drawings are evident. The eyes are arranged in an equilateral triangle, and one of them is placed at the center of the body's lower section; for this reason it is called "central eye", from which it pours a corrosive, ocher-colored liquid on its enemies. The acid is likely produced by an exocrine gland inside the Angel. 

Matarael is first detected in Sagami Bay by the radar surveillance of the Fuchū headquarters of the UN Armed Forces, which identify it as the eighth Angel and not as the ninth, being unaware of the existence of Lilith. Once ashore, Matarael invades Tokyo-3 and decides to penetrate the Nerv by corroding an armored portcullis leading to the organization's headquarters. The Angel pours its acid into the wells dug in the sixth episode of the series by the Angel Ramiel, and its strategy suggests it is mindful of its predecessor's actions. It clashes with Eva 00, 01 and 02, which defeat it with gunfire. The staff wanted to create something reminiscent of an upside-down turtle. The name Matarael (Hebrew:) also comes from the Book of Enoch, where he is described as the angel of rain. The name of Evangelion's Matarael refers to its offensive strategy and its powerful, corrosive acid, which it rains on its enemies.

Sahaquiel
, the tenth Angel, appears in Earth's orbit above the Indian Ocean using its body as a bomb. Its symmetrical body shape is similar to that of some single-celled organisms such as amoebas. The Angel's body is very large; more than twelve times larger than an Eva, making Sahaquiel the largest Angel in Neon Genesis Evangelion. Its skin is orange with small, blue inserts. On its body are three geometric, yellow-and-green figures that resemble the human eye. The Angel's core is located within its central eye. Before attacking the Nerv headquarters, Sahaquiel detaches some small portions of its main mass that are equipped with an AT Field and high destructive power, and hurls them to the ground as missiles to correct its trajectory. Its ability to divide, which is similar to Israfel's, resembles the budding of protozoa and mesozoa. It can materially interfere with Nerv's military equipment, destroying a research satellite and jamming enemy ground communications. Once it arrives at Tokyo-3, Sahaquiel is jammed by Unit 01 while its AT Field is breached by Unit 00. Eva-02 destroys its core, defeating it.

For Sahaquiel staff took inspiration from the angel of the same name mentioned in the Third Book of Enoch as the angel of the heavens and guardian of the fourth heaven of Paradise, which is referenced in the fictional Angel's aerial attack strategy. The connection with the biblical Sahaquiel's guardian function is realized in its elongated shape, which resembles that of a deformed eye. The name Sahaquiel is translatable as "Ingenuity of God", which Will Rauss interpreted as a possible allusion to the Angel's uses of its AT Field. Its design was inspired by surrealist art. In the initial draft, Sahaquiel had a sharp, string-shaped body similar to Armisael's. Sadamoto drew the Angel to show Evangelion's enemies may not always be anthropomorphic, like the Seele.

In the Rebuild of Evangelion saga, Sahaquiel is introduced as the eighth Angel. Its design by Mahiro Maeda has several changes; in the movie Evangelion 2.0, its AT Field is powerful enough to distort the path of light and its body, which was initially spherical, unravels and changes shape, revealing silhouettes of humans on its surface. At the bottom of its main body, Sahaquiel develops an anthropomorphic entity that pierces Unit 01's hands with spear-like weapons, which were designed by director Takeshi Honda. During the production, Maeda proposed human shapes dancing on the lower part of the sphere. In the trailer, Sahaquiel is shown with a mosaic effect to hide its features from the audience. The new design of Sahaquiel was difficult to animate; the staff were on a tight production schedule, and experimented and remade scenes in a state of confusion, changing them up to the deadline. Masayuki, assistant director in the storyboard phase, suggested having Sahaquiel die in a wave of blood that floods Tokyo-3, which was inspired by the tokusatsu tradition and the scene in which Sapporo collapses in the Japanese science fiction series Japan Sinks (1974).

Iruel

, also known as Yroul, Yrouel and Ireul, is the eleventh Angel, which first manifests itself as corrosive stains on a wall of the Nerv headquarters. At this early stage, Iruel behaves in the same manner as an obligate anaerobic bacterium. Nerv attempts but fails to eradicate Iruel by increasing the presence of ozone in the air. Unlike its predecessors, Iruel is a colony of Angels and microscopic nanomachines-sized individuals rather than a single individual. These singularities, similar to bacteria, are united in an agglomeration that quickly evolves radically to take on the form of a computer. After acquiring the typical characteristics of a living organism and an electronic circuit, Iruel seeks the access code to the three Magi supercomputers, the most important part of the structure, to activate a program of self-destruction at the headquarters. Dr. Ritsuko Akagi devises a "reverse hacking" strategic plan, believing it is better to increase the enemy's evolution and insert a program to make Iruel choose to coexist with the Magi System. Ritsuko's program defeats Iruel, the headquarters is saved and the central computer returns to ordinary mode.

Animator Mitsuo Iso, the scriptwriter of the thirteenth episode of the series, suggested a battle against an invisible enemy and the basic plot of the installment during the production. In religious texts, Iruel is referred to as the angel of fear. Writer Will Raus interpreted the sense of dread felt by Nerv members during its attack as a reference to the biblical angel. The Angel's program of self-extinction can be likened to cellular apoptosis while coexistence with the Magi System brings it into a condition of symbiosis with the Nerv's computers. Iruel's properties, such as self-replication, data processing, and colony self-regulation are similar to those of a universal molecular assembler. In common language and science fiction, it indicates a hypothetical, microscopic assembler that can build anything atom by atom, a process modern science considers impossible. Evangelion Chronicle encyclopedia noted this detail suggests Angels are technologically superior to humans.

Leliel
 is the twelfth Angel. Its body is divided into two parts, each with different physical characteristics; the first is a black-and-white-streaked floating sphere while the second looks like a black shadow. The spherical body is its true shadow, while the apparent shadow on the ground is the main body. It extends its AT Field in the vicinity of its enemy, a process that coincides with the manifestation of the apparent shadow, which is capable of engulfing the matter it encounters. This physicality is maintained using an inverted AT Field, within which extends a number-imaginary space, a parallel dimension named Dirac Sea. During a fight, the dark shadow extends to the feet of the Eva-01 and begins to engulf it, trapping it within its space. It is not made clear whether Leliel's goal is the absorption of the humanoid or direct contact with its pilot, Shinji Ikari. Dr. Ritsuko Akagi devises a strategy to destroy Leliel and recover Unit 01. The plan calls for all existing N2 bombs to be dumped into the Angel's shadow, interfering with the AT Fields of the two Evas left for a thousandth of a second in the enemy's imaginary number space. During the countdown to ordnance release, the floating, spherical body breaks and Unit 01 emerges, causing an anomaly in the imaginary number circuit and shooting down the enemy.

In Judeo-Christian tradition, Leliel is the angel of the night and is called the "prince of conception". The fictional Angel's shadow and the outflow of Unit 01, which resembles childbirth and gives it the characteristics of a womb, allude to the biblical angel. Geometric figures similar to female genitalia are visible in the geometric pattern of the spherical body. The name Leliel means "jaw of God", which Will Raus interpreted as a reference to the fictional Angel's ability to consume any object that comes into contact with its real body.

The image of a dark shadow wandering in a summer setting and the geometric pattern of the Angel's spherical body are inspired by Surrealism and optical art. Japanese architect Yasutaka Yoshimura compared Leliel's design with Bridget Riley's work Fragment 5. To explain the Angel's nature and its Dirac sea, Ritsuko said its body is made up of strings. While trapped inside the Angel, Shinji encounters and converses with another self, which is presumed to be Leliel. The scene, which is set on a train, was the idea of assistant director Kazuya Tsurumaki, who was inspired by a dream he had as a child. According to the official film books of the series, the two Shinji in the sequence represent the psychological concepts of ego and superego. The Dirac Sea depicted in the anime took inspiration from Paul Dirac's concept of the same name and is also drawn from the novel  by Japanese writer Ryu Mitsuse.

The Leliel episode was originally intended to include a simple, traditional battle following the track established by the previous episodes; the production staff, however, decided to include an episode with an Angel that is more interested in humans than in their annihilation to avoid revealing the riddles about the Angels' true nature. For the clash, Gainax condensed the ideas of what should have been a trilogy of episodes with the same theme. In the initial scenario, Leliel would select Japanese from the verses of some animals and several human languages so it could communicate with Shinji. Tsurumaki and the production staff changed their minds, finding the idea of an Angel conversing in human language "too anti-climactic" and "pulp fiction", and devised the final scenario, in which "Shinji converses with himself".

Bardiel
 is the thirteenth Angel. Its nature is similar to that of a fungus or a parasitic bacterium, allowing it to infiltrate the body of the Eva-03, which is being transported by air from the US division to the Japanese headquarters of Nerv. Bardiel's incubation period is extended; symptoms only become obvious during the mecha's activation test and after its pilot, Toji Suzuhara, is exposed to the infection. After the contamination, a crack opens on the unit's back, inside which molten filaments similar to hypha are visible. 

Bardiel does not need an external energy source and does not draw energy from the Eva-03's internal battery. Its wave diagram is orange, like that of Leliel, a factor that does not allow its immediate identification. During its advance towards Tokyo-3, Bardiel fights against the 00, making a white, irritant liquid drip inside the unit's body. Bardiel's attack mode does not belong to a single being that acts upon its own will, but to a colony of microscopic Angels with dimensions equal to that of bacteria that cooperate and work in a community like Iruel. Eva-03 undergoes rapid morphological mutations that are normally impossible for humanoids, such as the elongation of its arms, which in the course of combat become three times their normal size. The Angel is defeated by Shinji Ikari's Eva-01, which is activated by a new piloting system named Dummy System, which destroys the infected Evangelion.

In Jewish mystical tradition, and particularly in the writings of Enoch, Bardiel is the angel that rules hail. In Western angelology, he is considered the angel of lightning. The fictional Angel's contamination during the passage of Unit 03 in a blanket of storm clouds alludes to the biblical angel. Most of the scenes of Bardiel were produced by Production I.G, which also contributed to the animation of the fight against the Angel Iruel. In the Rebuild of Evangelion, Iruel is introduced as the ninth Angel.

Zeruel
, the fourteenth Angel. Zeruel is almost anthropomorphic, with an appearance similar to that of a mutilated man. It has upper and lower limbs, both without extremities, a long, square trunk, and a skull-like upper opening at the height of the neck. On its back are signs of a pair of wings, which in classical and popular iconography are the symbol of angelic creatures. In combat, Zeruel shows great physical strength, becoming the first of all the Angels in the series to invade Central Dogma. Zeruel is able to evade detection by radar equipment, allowing it to penetrate the headquarters of the organization unimpeded. Zeruel has two main modes of attack; it emits explosive beams of light from its eyes, and can use its thin upper limbs by means of a blade-and-bellows-like mechanism, spreading them out from its shoulders and recoiling them after striking its opponent. Although the Angel's core is exposed in the center of the chest, unlike the previous Angels it has a protective armor to hide it in case of danger. Using this security system, Zeruel defends itself from Rei's Unit 00, which tries to conduct a suicide attack by means of an N2 bomb. This ability suggests the enemy is aware of the N2 device and that there is some kind of communication system between the Angel specimens. Zeruel is defeated by the Eva-01, which entered the berserk state to devour it, introjecting its S2 engine.

Zeruel's first attack technique is inspired by that of Ultraman Jet Beetle. In the Judeo-Christian mystical tradition, Zeruel is the angel of power, a reference to its physical strength. Its name can be translated as "arm of God", to which its second offensive technique alludes. The manga artist Yoshitō Asari collaborated in the conception of its basic structure. According to Asari; "When I was asked to collaborate, I was told that the Angel's body should appear slow and clumsy, but that it was so strong that it could make fun of [the Evangelion]". For the episode's basic theme, in which Shinji chooses to fight against the enemy after temporarily leaving Nerv, some ideas originally planned for the fifteenth episode were used.

In the Rebuild of Evangelion, Zeruel is introduced as the tenth Angel. Asari again designed the creature; except for the skull, which is almost identical to the one in the classic series, the movie's Zeruel has paper-like tentacles it wraps around its body like the bands of a mummy. During the fight, it devours Unit 00 with Rei Ayanami, assuming the appearance of an anthropomorphic female figure, but it is defeated by Eva-01. For the likeness of the new Zeruel, the animators took inspiration from the monster King Joe from Ultraseven and an Angel in the original draft of the series, a cube-shaped "origami Apostolo" inspired by the Möbius strip. Its anthropomorphic female form is inspired by Riderman from Kamen Rider.

Arael
 is the fifteenth Angel. It appears and remains in geostationary orbit for the entire duration of its observation. Its body is luminescent, so its actual appearance is never shown. At first, it is motionless at a constant distance from Earth, deploying giant luminescent wings. Asuka Langley Soryu with her Eva-02 positions herself at the center of Tokyo-3 to intercept it, but the Angel begins to erode her mind using a wave that radars cannot detect. According to Ritsuko, Arael's attack is an attempt to investigate the human heart and contact the unit's pilot. The energetic light beam is visible to humans, a phenomenon attributed to the presence of an AT Field of unknown characteristics. The Angel makes Asuka relive her childhood trauma in an attempt to investigate her mental wavelength by learning her mechanisms and rendering the human on board the Evangelion harmless. Unit 02 and 00 attack Arael with their firearms, but their attempts are thwarted by its strong AT Field. Arael is defeated by Eva-00, which launches into orbit a weapon called Longinus' spear, which quickly reaches the orbit and destroys Arael's AT Field.

An official pamphlet on the series notes; "If it appeared in satellite orbit with this strategy in mind or possibly if it had attained the ability to launch a psychological attack for this strategy, it can be said that this Angel is highly intelligent". In the Judeo-Christian mystical tradition, Arael is the angel of birds; its bird-like appearance in the show is a reference to this. The name Arael can be translated as "light" or "vision of God", and it is also regarded as the angel of the vision, which Will Raus interpreted as  referenced by the beam of light through which the fictional Angel attacks Asuka's psyche. During the production of the series, its role underwent changes: Arael was planned to appear in the nineteenth episode; it would appear in the Earth's atmosphere and would use its twelve semi-transparent wings as a high-frequency cutting weapon. The Evangelion units would face it in an aerial confrontation, in which Shinji would attempt to save Asuka. The sequences of the psychological battle between the Angel and Asuka have been compared to Gestalt psychology, in particular by the field theory of the German psychologist Kurt Lewin, according to which each individual is part of a context in which each one creates a personal reality.

Armisael

 is the sixteenth Angel, the penultimate to appear in the original series. Initially, it has a luminescent body and an ill-defiled circular shape that later stabilizes above the valley of Ōwaku, rotating around its axis. Once its rotation stops, the Angel metamorphosizes into a string, in which form it is able to stretch its body and perform fast movements. Taking advantage of its speed, it launches an attack against Unit 00, piercing its body at the level of the womb. Armisael seeks physical and mental contact with the target, violating the components of the unit, which is led by pilot Rei Ayanami. It is speculated Armisael continues Arael's psychic incursion, launching into a communicative attack on Rei. Under attack, Rei loses her senses and inside her mind she meets another self that is Armisael, which sweetly speaks to her using the words from her own unconscious mind. The Angel asks Rei to unite with it to alleviate the pain caused by the attack. After awakening, Rei activates a process of self-destruction of her unit, sending its core out of control and causing a reversal of the AT Field. Rei causes a violent explosion that engulfs and annihilates the Angel, and much of Tokyo-3.

In religious texts Armisael is the angel of the womb; in Jewish tradition a woman could relieve the pain of childbirth by invoking his name. During the battle on 00's back, a heteromorphic organism with contours that recall the forms of the previous Angels develops. Armisael thus contains the genetic information of the other Angels. Its shape is similar to a double helix ring and is reminiscent of the genetic structure of human beings or a mathematical surface that cannot be oriented, such as the Möbius strip and the Klein's bottle. Shortly before the explosion and the Angel's defeat, Eva-00 assumes the silhouette of Rei Ayanami, while Armisael is arranged on her head like a halo, an iconographic Christian attribute of angels and saints. It is not clear whether this form constitutes the true physiognomy of Unit 00 or if it is the result of Armisael's control or one of its possible evolutions. Armisael, confirming the hypothesis of a communication between the Angels and mindful of its predecessors' experiences, is aware of the human psyche. During the clash, it is scratched by the Prog-Knife of 01, emitting a cry similar to that of a human.

Tabris
The seventeenth Angel  is the last to appear in Neon Genesis Evangelion. In the animated series, it is known as Kaworu Nagisa, the new pilot of the Eva-02. After arriving in Tokyo-3, Tabris takes possession of the unit in an attempt to break into the deepest part of the Nerv headquarters, where it believes Adam, whose soul has been implanted in its own body, is kept. Upon discovering the white giant guarded in the Nerv is Lilith, Tabris decides to stop its attack and entrusts its fate to Shinji's Unit 01, allowing itself to be killed. According to the Nuctemeron of Apollonius of Tyana, Tabris is a demon and the angel of free will. Evangelion Tabris, echoing the function of ancient religious sources, chooses to die at the hands of Ikari, leaving humanity to survive. Nuctemeron also mentions a demon called Cahor, pronounced  in Japanese, which is referred to as the angel of deception, a detail the Evangelion Chronicle encyclopedia relates to Tabris' deceptive, anthropomorphic appearance. Like Arael and Armisael, which attempt to make contact with Asuka's and Rei's souls, Kaworu aggressively tries to touch Shinji's thoughts through a peaceful human exchange rather than an open attack, using words and expressions to demonstrate its friendly feelings. Tabris claims the Angels' AT Fields are "the walls of the heart" everyone possesses, so it neutralizes Shinji's AT Field by eliminating the wall around his heart. Following previous Angels, which have taken various forms, Tabris adopted the form of a man by gathering information from its predecessors.

Lilin
According to rabbinic scriptures, the Lilim, known as Lilin, are the children of Adam and his first wife, Lilith. In the movie The End of Evangelion, it is revealed humans are the eighteenth and final Angel, and direct descendants of Lilith.

In Rebuild of Evangelion
Other Angels are introduced in the  film tetralogy Rebuild of Evangelion, while those that appear in the original anime have a different numbering. In the films, the Angels were made with three-dimensional and CG models, with the exception of the ninth and tenth Angels, which are based on Bardiel and Zeruel. A rainbow appears when the Angels are killed; according to Comic Book Resources' Danny Hernandez, the symbol may refer to Genesis, according to which God placed a rainbow in the sky by God as a testimony of His covenant with Noah. In the Rebuild series, the Angels do not have names; according to Masayuki, their names were excluded in the scripting phase because they were never used by the staff, who barely remembered them. 

The new Angels that appear in the films are:
The . Its body, which is composed of bones, is similar to a snake skeleton. The third Angel is equipped with four small limbs for walking, an Evangelion cockpit, a tail and a long neck similar to wings which it uses to fly. It is unearthed from permafrost in the Palearctic, and is sealed by the European branch of the Nerv to be researched and dissected. To kill its enemies, the third Angel uses light beams, which it uses to fight against the Eva-05. The fight takes place in the Bethany base, where it is defeated. Its basic design was conceived by Hideaki Anno, who during production thought of giving it the ability to spit acid, taking inspiration from the monster  from Ultraman. Anno asked Mohiro Kitoh to redefine its appearance, suggesting something in the style of Narutaru.
The  is shaped like a grandfather clock; its head is identical to Sachiel's mask and is capable of rotating like the hands of a clock. It has a fake oscillating core that it uses as a decoy and an authentic core that is hidden inside its body. The seventh Angel moves by freezing the sea's surface; it uses water to kill its enemies and is defeated by Eva-02. It reprises the role of Gaghiel, which appears in the eighth episode of the classic series. The seventh Angel was included in the movie due to technical necessity; the genga or key frames of the eighth episode were lost and the production staff rethought the entire scenario of Asuka's arrival. It was designed by second unit director Daizen Komatsuda to resemble a drinking bird. The creature's face is the work of animator Shigeto Koyama, while the body, which was designed by Anno, is inspired by the Toshiba IHI building at the 1970 Osaka Expo.
The , which is introduced in the film Evangelion: 3.0 You Can (Not) Redo (2012),  takes the form of a set of black filaments that emerge from Mark.06 and is eaten by Evangelion 13.

In other media
Angels appear in works based on Neon Genesis Evangelion with different appearances and roles. In the comic book adaptation of the series, which was drawn by character designer Yoshiyuki Sadamoto, Sandalphon, Matarael, Iruel and Leliel do not appear and the number of Angels is reduced to twelve. More differences are introduced in the manga Neon Genesis Evangelion: Campus Apocalypse, in which they are depicted as creatures that take possession of dead bodies to obtain gems called "cores".

In the video game Shin seiki Evangelion: 2nd Impression, an Angel called  is introduced. The Angel presents itself in different forms. In the first form, the Angel's body is formed by disc-shaped plates, from which sprout small, scissor-like spines, and on the bottom some limbs similar to those of an insect. After a metamorphosis, it transforms into a pupa and then evolves into its final flying-insect-like form. In its third form, the Angel splits its AT Field and absorbs the energy of the Evangelion units. In the course of the video game, all three of Nerv's Evas confront Original Angel, which inflicts severe damage to 00 and 02. In one of the video game's scenarios, Shinji is nearly defeated in combat but Unit 01 goes into the berserk status and confronts it. Its body, which is an immaterial shadow with no substance, allows it to revive after each apparent defeat. Original Angel's core is hidden inside a girl named Mayumi Yamagishi. The Angel, in another scenario, is allowed to absorb all of 01's energy so it goes into overdrive and is defeated. Original Angel was designed by Mahiro Maeda, who had also worked on the classic series.

In the board game , which was published by Kadokawa Shoten, Angels Sachiel, Shamshel, Ramiel, Gaghiel, Israfel, Materael and Sahaquiel, and two new Angels appear. The first, has the appearance of a purple-colored mollusk. On the top of the shell is a graphic motif in the shape of a human eye. The second, called , is orange and spherical.

The Angels have also been used in video games based on the television series and other games detached from the Evangelion franchise, as in MapleStory, Million Arthur, Monster Hunter Explore and in the video games  and Summons Board by GunHo Online Entertainment. In the Divine Gate video game by the same production company, the Angels of the Rebuild series are depicted in anthropomorphic robes and have different names. An enemy similar to Neon Genesis Evangelion Angels appears in a crossover episode of the anime Shinkansen Henkei Robo Shinkalion, whose design combines those of several Rebuild Angels.
In the Transformers X Evangelion crossover WebNovel the ghost of the Decepticon Starscream possesses a Angel and mutates it into the appearance his old body and renames himself Angel-Scream before being defeated by Optimus Prime.

Cultural references and interpretations

Writers Patrick Drazen and Dani Cavallaro analyzed the series' cosmology, comparing it with the Shinto cosmology presented in the texts of the Kojiki and Nihon shoki. According to Drazen, the cosmogony proposed by Anno, despite the Judeo-Christian references, presents a strong Japanese background. He compared the First Impact, and the presence of the White Moon of the Angels and the Black Moon of humanity, to the Japanese myth on the origin of the world, according to which the cosmos was born from a primordial, chaotic, egg-like soup from which light and darkness were separated. Drazen, noting the Black Moon is placed on the Izu Peninsula, interpreted the mythopoiesis of the series as a cosmogony according to which all human life on Earth springs from Japan, as a hi-tech version of Kojiki.

According to writers Jonathan Clements and Helen McCarthy, the use of Western religious symbols, such as cruciform explosions generated by Angels, leads one to think of Western beliefs as an alien invasion within Evangelion, but in their view the symbols are rooted in Anno's insights into archetypes and Jungian psychology. Writers have interpreted Evangelion as a recreation of the Pacific War from the Japanese point of view, especially regarding the final apocalyptic events. Susan J. Napier, an American critic and writer, linked the monstrous creatures in Neon Genesis Evangelion and other anime to the atomic bomb trauma suffered by the Japanese people after the bombings of Hiroshima and Nagasaki.

According to researcher Marcello Ghilardi, the Angels reflect the feelings of a part of Japanese youth of the 1990s, a time when Japanese society was in the midst of an economic crisis and when "the ability to react and trust in the future seemed to have vanished", while the impossibility of clearly identifying the origin of the difficulties paralyzed society and made it made "prey to a sense of expectation and precariousness". Their identification code, "Blood Type – Blue", is an homage to the alternative title of the sci-fi film Blue Christmas (1978) by Kihachi Okamoto, an influential author for Anno. Neon Genesis Evangelion manga editor Carl Gustav Horn noted that in some doctrines of the Jewish Kabbalah angels are not conceived as alien entities, but as beings that were present and recently awakened in the Creation.

Critics compared the Angels to the kaijū, monsters typical of Japanese science fiction. Anime Academy reviewers linked Evangelion to earlier monster-of-the-week products, such as Sailor Moon and Power Rangers, tracing influences to Macross and the works of Gō Nagai. Art magazine Real Time also analyzed the Angels, saying their design reflects ancient and modern archetypes, comparing them to Aztec paintings, Joan Miró murals and Donald Judd cubes. IGN's Ramsey Isler interpreted the battles against the Angels as a metaphor for Anno's attempts to defeat his internal demons and depression. Scholar Mariana Ortega, noting the mythological Lilith represents "the Other Side", a dark world in which deep libidinal and unconscious desires are not controlled, interpreted Neon Genesis Evangelion as a possible tale of psychic struggles between ego and unconscious, Jungian shadow and anima/animus. According to Ortega, the purpose of the Nerv, the Seele and the Angels is a return to the womb. Dani Cavallaro said the Angels can be seen as concretizations of the main characters' anxieties and fears. Fifth Wall Renaissance's Alexander Greco also interpreted them as representations of Shinji's fears. Other scholars have described the Angels as representations of the Other that Shinji must face to form his identity. Japanese writer Kotani Mari also interpreted the Angels as a representation of the concept of abjection, which was formulated by philosopher Julia Kristeva. Susan Napier, noting the Angels are explicitly associated with Gendo throughout the series, described them as father figures. Hideaki Anno himself compared Gendo and the first Angel Adam to father figures, saying he took inspiration from the Oedipal complex postulated by Sigmund Freud.

Cultural impact

Popularity and critical reception
The Angels' designs and fighting styles received positive reviews from critics and audiences. In 2017 the news magazine Livedoor News opened a survey asking the fans to choose their favorite Angel; in the poll, Adam and Ramiel ranked first and second, respectively. The magazine, talking about the reasons for Ramiel's popularity, discussed the beauty of its geometric features and felt sorry for Arael's low position of the eleventh place. Anime News Network's Nick Creamer praised the first confrontation against Sachiel, calling its disc face "iconic". Creamer also lauded the battles against the Angels, describing them as "a captivating combination of eerily distinct monster designs, creative tactical setups, and gorgeous, horrifying fight animation".

The synchronized battle against Israfel received positive reviews from critics. Comic Book Resources described the fight as one of the best action scenes in the entire series. The fights against Bardiel and Zeruel also drew positive opinions. The US magazine Anime Invasion ranked the Zeruel battle as the eighth-best fight in Japanese animation history. Stuart Nilson, a reviewer for Hoopla.nu, praised the changes introduced in the film Evangelion 2.0 and the variety of Angels' appearances. Martin Theron of Anime News Network and Nicoletta Browne of THEM Anime Reviews also made positive comments about their design, describing them as "jaw-dropping" and "nothing short of astounding". Anime News Network's Justin Sevakis appreciated the omission of their names in the Rebuild of Evangelion films without the Judeo-Christian references from the original series, which he described as "confusing and problematic".

Merchandise and legacy
Images of the Angels have been used to produce merchandising items, such as action figures, T-shirts, paperweights, bags, underwear, collectible models and foodstuffs. In 2005, to celebrate the tenth anniversary of the first airing of the series, manga artist Mine Yoshizaki designed several action figures of the Angels in anthropomorphic likenesses for a line titled Angel XX; among the various models, he designed Lilith and Sachiel puppets inspired by Rei Ayanami's character design. The website Evastore, the official distributor of articles and merchandise inspired by Neon Genesis Evangelion, adopted as its mascot an Angel named Yuru-Shito, which was later used for products and an official role-playing game of the series.

According to Guido Tavassi, a scholar and critic of Japanese animation, the "revolutionary" appearance of the Angels is among the stylistic innovations introduced by the anime, "[which] proposes a complete abstraction of the shapes of the enemies ... with a choice that will have an enormous impact on the design of the series of the [mecha] genre that followed". Matarael's design inspired Nobuhiro Watsuki to create the eye costume of Usui Uonuma, one of the characters in the manga Rurouni Kenshin. A parody of Matarael appears in FLCL, an OAV series produced by Gainax studio. Leliel inspired Yūichirō Oguro to create the enemies of Gekiganger 3, the aliens of the Kyo'akk Empire who come from a dimension called "Dark String Universe". Staff of Avatar: The Last Airbender also took inspiration from the Angels of Evangelion for the design of the panda Hei Bei. Jonathan Clements and Helen McCarthy have traced a possible Evangelion influence on the Dolems, RahXephon main antagonists. For Sci Fi Weekly Tasha Robinson, Aquarion Shadow Angels can also be influenced by Evangelion Angels. IGN's Jemima Sebastian compared a scene in Godzilla vs. Kong, in which King Kong on a ship suffers an underwater attack from Godzilla, to the fight between Gaghiel and Eva-02 from the eighth episode of the series. The same author also noted how an evolution of Algomon presented in the Digimon anime is reminiscent of the design of some of the Angels from Neon Genesis Evangelion'.Polygon and IGN compared the unfurled design of the flying cryptid Jean Jacket in Jordan Peele's Nope with Sahaquiel. Peele also publicly made his fandom of the series known in the days leading up to the film's release. On July 25, 2022, Slashfilm confirmed via Peele's production notes for Nope that the film's principle premise and movie monster Jean Jacket had been specifically inspired by the Angels of Neon Genesis Evangelion''; Peele himself stated that he was particularly impressed by Sahaquiel.

See also

 List of Neon Genesis Evangelion characters
 Evangelion (mecha)
 Mahiro Maeda

Notes

References 

 
 
 
 
 
 
 
 
 
 
 
 
 

Neon Genesis Evangelion
Extraterrestrial species and races by work
Neon Genesis Evangelion characters
Kaiju
Neon Genesis Evangelion lists